The January 15, 2014 Baghdad bombings occurred on 15 January 2014 when at least eight car bombs exploded in north, central and eastern Baghdad killing 40 civilians and injuring 88 others. The bombs targeted a number of open-stall markets and commercial areas, attempting to inflict the maximum number of casualties.

References

2014 murders in Iraq
21st-century mass murder in Iraq
Mass murder in 2014
Terrorist incidents in Iraq in 2014
Terrorist incidents in Baghdad
January 2014 events in Iraq
2010s in Baghdad
Marketplace attacks in Iraq